Hicks Island is an island about 1 km southeast of Cape Grenville in the Great Barrier Reef Marine Park Queensland, Australia, in Temple Bay about 200 km northeast of Kutini-Payamu National Park and Lockhart River in the Cape York Peninsula. This island is part of the Home Islands Group.

Birdlife
Hicks Island is also part of the Cape York to Cape Grenville Islands Important Bird Area.  The island is inhabited by species such as the pied imperial-pigeon, bridled tern, roseate tern and lesser crested tern.

References

Islands on the Great Barrier Reef
Uninhabited islands of Australia
Islands of Far North Queensland
Places in the Great Barrier Reef Marine Park